The monk snake (Suta monachus), also known commonly as the hooded snake, is a species of venomous snake in the family Elapidae. The species is native to central and western Australia.

Geographic range
Within Australia, S. monachus is found in the states and territories of Northern Territory, South Australia, and Western Australia.

Habitat
The preferred natural habitats of S. monachus are savanna and shrubland.

Description
The top of the head is solid glossy black, without any pale markings. On average, this black "hood" extends on the nape to the fourth vertebral scale, but may extend only to the first or as far as the sixth. The body and tail are brick red dorsally, and white ventrally. The upper labials are white also. There is only one posterior temporal scale.

Diet
S. monachus preys upon lizards.

Reproduction
S. monachus is viviparous.

Venom
Although S. monachus is venomous, its bite is considered to be of lesser medical significance. A life-threatening envenomation is unlikely, but a debilitating injury is possible.

References

Further reading
Cogger HG (2014). Reptiles and Amphibians of Australia, Seventh Edition. Clayton, Victoria, Australia: CSIRO Publishing. xxx + 1,033 pp. .
Storr GM (1964). "Denisonia monachus, a new elapid snake from Western Australia". Western Australian Naturalist 9: 89–90.
Wilson, Steve; Swan, Gerry (2013). A Complete Guide to Reptiles of Australia, Fourth Edition. Sydney: New Holland Publishers. 522 pp. .

Snakes of Australia
Suta
Reptiles described in 1964
Taxobox binomials not recognized by IUCN